John Block may refer to:

John Block (South African politician) (born 1968), South African politician
John Nicolaas Block (1929–1994), Dutch aviation pioneer
John Rusling Block (born 1935), United States Secretary of Agriculture
John Block (basketball), (born 1944), American basketball player
John Block (filmmaker) (born 1951), American filmmaker
Jack Block (1924–2010), American psychology professor
John Block (New Mexico politician), American politician